Sanday Airport  is located  north northeast of Kirkwall Airport on Sanday, Orkney Islands, Scotland.

Sanday Aerodrome has a CAA Ordinary Licence (Number P541) that allows flights for the public transport of passengers or for flying instruction as authorised by the licensee (Orkney Islands Council). The aerodrome is not licensed for night use.

Airline and destinations

References

External links
Airfields at Orkney Islands Council website

Airports in Orkney
Sanday, Orkney